The title Nothing at all or Nothin' at all may refer to:

Music

Songs
"Nothing At All", 1953 song by T. Texas Tyler 
"Nothing At All", 1957 song by The Wilburn Brothers	
"Nothin' At All", 1964 song by The Mojos 
"Nothing At All", 1965 song by The Bats (South Africa)
"Nothing At All", 1966 song by Spike Milligan
"Nothing at All", 1969 song by Status Quo from the album Spare Parts
"Nothing At All", 1970 song by the group Gentle Giant
"Nothing At All", 1975 song by Hall & Oates
"Nothing At All", 1979 song by Dennis Waterman
"Nothing At All", 1980 song by the group Matumbi
"Nothing At All", 1985 song by the band Edge City	
"Nothin' at All" (Heart song), 1986 song by the band Heart
"Nothing At All", 1986 song by The Glitter Band 
"Nothing At All", 1991 song by the group Exile 
"Nothing at All" (Santana song), 2003 song by the group Santana
"Nothing at All" (Kasey Chambers song), 2006 single by Kasey Chambers
"Nothing At All", 2007 song by the band The Shins 

"Nothing At All", song by the duo of Don Travis & Peter Gardner

Theme tracks
"Nothing At All", a track performed by singer and voice artist Sandy Howell for the anime program Sailor Moon

See also
All or Nothing at All", song originally written in 1939
All or Nothing at All, 1958 Billie Holiday album
"Nuthin' At All", a 2005 song by rapper Bizarre
"Nothing at all!" / "Stupid sexy Flanders!", a catchphrase / internet meme originating from an episode of The Simpsons called "Little Big Mom"